Zero Woman is a Japanese film and video exploitation series with ten entries dating from 1974 to 2007. The series chronicles the adventures of a woman Rei, who, working for a fictional Tokyo Metropolitan Police Department secret agency called Zero Division, goes undercover to infiltrate and assassinate drug kingpins, mercenaries, and various criminals and their henchmen. The original film may have been the inspiration for Luc Besson's 1990 film La Femme Nikita.

Series
 was released by the Toei studio in May 1974. Along with Female Convict 701: Scorpion and its sequels, it was part of Toei's Pinky Violence series of sexploitation films made in response to the success of the Nikkatsu studio's Roman Porno titles. The film starred Miki Sugimoto as Rei who is released from prison to become the deadly assassin Zero Woman for a secret government agency. Also featured are Eiji Gō, Tetsurō Tamba, Hideo Murota and Yōko Mihara. The film was directed by Yukio Noda and like the Female Convict Scorpion series was based on a manga by Tōru Shinohara.

Possibly due to the success of the 1990 La Femme Nikita and the 1993 American film rendition of the Nikita story, Point of No Return, in the mid-1990s, a movie and a series of low-budget straight-to-video V-cinema releases based on the original Zero Woman appeared. A different actress played Rei in each of the productions. The January 1995 movie,  was directed by Koji Enokido and starred Naoko Iijima (as Rei) and Tokuma Nishioka.

From 1995 to 2004, seven V-cinema works were released:
  (1995) starring Natsuki Ozawa
  (1996) starring Kumiko Takeda
  (1996) starring Mai Tachihara
  (1997) starring Mikiyo Ono
  (1998) starring Chieko Shiratori
  (1998) starring Saori Ono
  (2004) starring Maiko Tōno

In 2007, the pink film studio Shintōhō Eiga released the tenth entry in the series, directed by Ken'ichi Fujiwara and starring Atsuko Miura as Rei. Also in the cast were Sasa Handa, Masaki Miura and Hiromitsu Kiba. The film was released theatrically by Shintōhō on May 26, 2007 and a DVD edition was published by the Take Shobo company in July 2007.

See also
 Femme fatale
 Girls with guns

References

External links
 

Action film series
Girls with guns films
Japanese direct-to-video films
Japanese film series
Films scored by Shigeru Umebayashi